Beijing BAIC Motor Men’s Volleyball Club, is a Chinese men’s volleyball club based in Beijing, founded in 1950s and changed to a professional club in 2010. It is established by Beijing Municipal Sports Bureau and BAIC Group on September 14, 2010. The team currently plays in the Chinese Men's League. They won the local league championship three times.

2019–20 team roster

Honours
Chinese Volleyball League
Champions (4): 2012-13, 2013-14, 2020-21, 2022-23
Runners-up (4): 2015-16, 2016-17, 2017-18, 2018-19
Third Place (1): 2014-15

AVC Club Volleyball Championship
Third place (1): 2014

Notable players

Foreigners
   Salvador Hidalgo Oliva (2012 – 2013)
  Steven Brinkman (2012 – 2013)
  Fred Winters (2012 – 2014)
   Wout Wijsmans (2013 – 2014)
  William Price (2014 – 2015)
  Armin Mustedanović (2014 – 2015)
  Nemanja Jakovljević (2015, in place of injured Armin Mustedanović)
  Thomas Edgar (2015 – 2016)
  Leonel Marshall Jr. (2015 – 2016)
  Taylor Sander (2016 – 2017)
  Oreol Camejo (2016 – 2017)
  John Gordon Perrin (2017 – 2018)
  Kévin Tillie (2017 – 2019) 
  Michał Kubiak (2018, only for Finals)
  Leonardo Leyva (2018 – 2020)
  Saeid Marouf (2019 – 2021)
  Kévin Le Roux (2019 – 2020)
  Maxwell Holt (2022 – present)
  Thomas Jaeschke (2022 – present)
  Yosvany Hernandez (2022 – present)

Local
  Hu Song (2001 - 2013)
  Wang Chen (2009 - 2014, 2015–present)
  Chu Hui (2012 - 2018)
  Liu Libin (2013 - 2017, 2019–present)
  Zhang Binglong (2013 - 2016, 2018–present)
  Jiang Chuan (2014–present)

See also
Beijing BAIC Motor women's volleyball team
Chinese Volleyball Super League
Shanghai Men's Volleyball Club

References

External links
 

Chinese volleyball clubs
Sport in Beijing
BAIC Group
Men's volleyball teams